Magdalena Margareta Stenbock (19 June 1744 – 18 July 1822), was a Swedish artist. She was an honorary member of the Royal Swedish Academy of Arts (1795).

She was the issue of count Gustaf Leonhard Stenbock and Fredrika Eleonora Horn af Ekebyholm and married in 1761 to general major baron Erik Julius Cederhielm.
She served as lady-in-waiting to the queen of Sweden, Sophia Magdalena of Denmark. Hedwig Elizabeth Charlotte of Holstein-Gottorp describe her in her famous journal as energetic and firm.

References

 Gustaf Elgenstierna, Den introducerade svenska adelns ättartavlor. 1925–36.
 Eva-Lena Bengtsson, intendent: Konstakademiens ledamöter. Från 1700-talet till 2011
 Carl Carlson Bonde (1902). Hedvig Elisabeth Charlottas dagbok I (1775–1782). Stockholm: Norstedt & Söners förlag. Libris 8207712

1744 births
1822 deaths
Swedish women painters
18th-century Swedish painters
Members of the Royal Swedish Academy of Arts
19th-century Swedish painters
19th-century Swedish women artists
18th-century Swedish women artists
19th-century Swedish artists